Benjamin Steinberg may refer to:

Benjamin Steinberg (conductor) (1915–1974), American symphony conductor and violinist
Benjamin Steinberg (politician) (1920–1975), Botswanan politician